Mike Law (a.k.a. The Claw and Mikl) is an Australian rockclimber known for establishing routes across Australia, especially in the Blue Mountains.

Climbing
He became prominent in the New Wave Australian climbing scene when he made the first free ascent of Janicepts (21) aged 15.

He went on to establish hundreds of routes around New South Wales and Victoria, notably the Blue Mountains and Arapiles where he became known for sandbagging and gave routes "The lowest grade [he] could without laughing".

Mikl wrote many unofficial guidebooks, first in paper form before the age of the internet and later online, including Rockclimbing at Mt Victoria (1978),  Melbourne climbs (1981), Sydney and Sea-cliffs (1983 and many subsequent editions) and Blue Mountains Selected climbs (1988). He also contributed to a number of published climbing guidebook, including many editions of Simon Carter's Blue Mountains Climbing.

Mikl performed extensive testing of climbing hardware and bolts in Australian's sandstone, resulting in the most established guide for  soft rock bolting. In 2013 he published the autobiography Law Unto Himself with Open Spaces Publishing.

Career
He went to university aged 34, got a PhD in Material Science. He worked at the Australian Nuclear Science and Technology Organisation until 2018, when he finally became a full time climber.

Publications

Many unofficial climbing guidebooks, some of which have later been translated into online websites.

References

Australian rock climbers
Living people
Year of birth missing (living people)